Alanson Russell "Lance" Loud (June 26, 1951 – December 22, 2001) was an American television personality, magazine columnist, and new wave rock-n-roll performer. Loud is best known for his 1973 appearance in An American Family, a pioneer reality television series that featured his coming out, leading to his status as an icon in the gay community.

Early life
Loud was born in La Jolla, California, in 1951, while his father was in the United States Navy. He spent his early childhood with his parents and four siblings in Eugene, Oregon, and his later childhood and adolescence in Santa Barbara, California. During his teens, Loud discovered Andy Warhol, The Factory, and The Velvet Underground. He later became penpals with Warhol. 

As a teenager, Loud drove some friends to the Haight-Ashbury to investigate the San Francisco neighborhood's renowned cultural scene. He hitchhiked to Altamont Raceway Park to attend the Altamont Free Concert, later the subject of the documentary Gimme Shelter.

An American Family
Loud's fame came with An American Family, a documentary of his family's life, which was broadcast in the U.S. on PBS in 1973, drawing 10 million viewers and causing considerable controversy. The show was based in Santa Barbara, California.

Loud moved to New York City, driven by his obsession with The Velvet Underground and the Warhol scene. He became a regular at Max's Kansas City and  attended Charles Ludlam productions at La Mama, with actors including Jackie Curtis (who later became a close Loud family friend) and Holly Woodlawn. Shortly after the series ended, Loud appeared on The Dick Cavett Show, performing with a working version of what would later become the band "The Mumps" (which at that point included his siblings Delilah, Michelle and Kevin in the line-up), under the name "Loud". He stated at the time that he thought the filmmakers had intentionally edited the series to make him seem obnoxious and grating.

Loud became a gay icon by having his homosexuality revealed to a national audience during the course of the documentary. His sexual orientation became a topic of national controversy and media scrutiny after several appearances on Dick Cavett and other talk shows, but the positive and grateful feedback from the gay community led Loud to embrace this role with passion and flamboyant, often self-deprecating wit.

The Mumps
Loud regrouped his band, called The Mumps, along with Santa Barbara High School friend Kristian Hoffman (also featured in An American Family), Rob Duprey (later of the Iggy Pop Band), high school alumnus Jay Dee Daugherty (later of the Patti Smith Group and The Church), and Aaron Kiley. Daugherty and Kiley were soon replaced in what would become The Mumps' long term line up: Lance Loud, Kristian Hoffman, Rob Duprey, Kevin Kiely, and Paul Rutner.

The Mumps were a popular band on the Max's Kansas City and CBGB circuit, as well as at other American clubs, for almost five years. They played on bills with rock and punk rock bands such as Television, Talking Heads, the Ramones, Blondie, Milk 'N' Cookies, The Cramps, Cheap Trick, and Van Halen. Despite this popularity and two critically acclaimed, independent 45s, they failed to secure a contract with a major record label. Two compilations of their music have been released: Fatal Charm (Eggbert Records, 1994), and a lavishly illustrated, remastered, 2-disc CD/DVD compilation, How I Saved The World, in 2005. The CD booklets contain affectionate tributes from members of the Cramps, Sparks, R.E.M., the New York Dolls, Blondie, Dramarama, the Go-Go's, Danzig, Devo, Patti Smith Group, and the Screamers, as well as praise from Danny Fields, Jayne County, Rufus Wainwright, and Paul Reubens, helping to secure The Mumps a place in musical history.

Loud wrote a monthly column in the influential Rock Scene magazine, where he reported on his favorite artists and covered unlikely junkets, such as a brief tour with Jim Dandy Mangrum from Black Oak Arkansas. Rock Scene was an early supporter of glam and the punk scene.

Journalism
When Loud retired from music, he became a noted columnist for several magazines, including The Advocate, Details, Interview, and Creem. Through journalism and sheer force of personality, Loud remained active in many cultural scenes throughout most of his adult life, giving occasional lectures on the impact of An American Family on American society at colleges around the country. He was present at the Andy Warhol Museum in Pittsburgh when his teenage letters to Andy were officially entered into the Andy Warhol archive.

The Loud family was kept in the public eye through two televised PBS updates, both filmed by the original Academy Award-winning team of Alan and Susan Raymond. The last, called Lance Loud! A Death in An American Family, was a poignant depiction of Loud's physical decline, from a 20-year addiction to crystal meth and complications from HIV. It was shown on PBS in January 2003.

Subsequent to the showing of A Death in An American Family, Pat and Bill Loud moved back in together, granting one of their oldest son's last wishes.  They lived very close to three of their four surviving children in California, with the exception of Kevin, who lives out-of-state with his family. Bill Loud died on July 26, 2018. Pat Loud died on January 10, 2021.

Death
In 2001, Loud entered the Carl Bean hospice in Los Angeles, California, suffering from HIV and hepatitis C. Realizing he was dying, Loud called the Raymonds back to film again, expressing dissatisfaction with the way An American Family ended and how the family members were portrayed in it. His wish was that the Louds be portrayed as the family Loud knew them to be. While in hospice care, he wrote his final article, "Musings on Mortality".

On December 22, 2001, Lance Loud died of liver failure as a result of hepatitis C and a co-infection with HIV.  He was 50 years old.

Portions of Loud's memorial gathering in the garden of Hollywood's Chateau Marmont are included in the documentary, A Death in An American Family, including tributes by his many friends.  A rendition of "Over the Rainbow" was sung by Loud's friend, Rufus Wainwright, while accompanied on piano by Wainwright's mother Kate McGarrigle.

Legacy
In 2010, HBO Films announced that it was making Cinema Verite, a film about the making of An American Family. Thomas Dekker was cast to play Loud. The film had its debut showing on HBO on April 23, 2011.

In 2012, Lance's mother authored a book about his life called Lance Out Loud; it was edited by Christopher Makos, a longtime friend of Lance, and published by Glitterati Incorporated.

Discography 
 Mumps: How I Saved the World (Sympathy for the Music Industry, 2005), an anthology of recordings, with a DVD of live performances. Loud is the lead singer and co-songwriter (with Kristian Hoffman) for this popular CBGB era NYC headlining pop/punk outfit.

References

External links
 Mumps on YouTube
 
 Lance Loud! A Death in An American Family at PBS

1951 births
2001 deaths
LGBT people from California
American columnists
American punk rock singers
Participants in American reality television series
Writers from Eugene, Oregon
Writers from San Diego

Writers from Santa Barbara, California
American gay writers
AIDS-related deaths in California
American gay musicians
20th-century American singers
People from La Jolla, San Diego
20th-century American LGBT people
21st-century American LGBT people